Ranimustine (INN, marketed under the tradename Cymerin; also known as MCNU) is a nitrosourea alkylating agent approved in Japan for the treatment of chronic myelogenous leukemia and polycythemia vera.

It has never been filed for FDA evaluation in the United States, where it is not marketed.

References

  Cymerin サイメリン (PDF) Mitsubishi Tanabe Pharma. October 2007.

Alkylating antineoplastic agents
Nitrosamines
Nitrosoureas
Ureas
Chloroethyl compounds